George Everett is an American accountant, real estate broker and former politician from Montana. Everett is a former Republican member of Montana House of Representatives.

Early life and education 
Everett was born in Kalispell, Montana on October 4, 1946.

Everett earned a Bachelor of Science degree from University of Montana in 1971.

Career 
Everett is a former accountant. In 1977, Everett became a real estate broker in Montana.

On November 5, 2002, Everett won the election and became a Republican member of Montana House of Representatives for District 84. Everett defeated Vince Woodhouse and Harm Toren with 69.99% of the votes.

On November 2, 2004, Everett won the election and became a Republican member of Montana House of Representatives for District 5. Everett defeated Samuel P. Nickel with 68.34% of the votes. On November 7, 2006, as an incumbent, Everett won the election and continued serving District 5. Everett defeated Linda Jaquette with 68.09% of the votes.

Personal life 
Everett's is married to Patti Everett and they have two children. Everett and his family live in Kalispell, Montana.

See also 
 Montana House of Representatives, District 5

References

External links 
 George Everett at ourcampaigns.com

1946 births
Living people
Republican Party members of the Montana House of Representatives
Politicians from Kalispell, Montana
University of Montana alumni